Highland Heights is a home rule-class city in Campbell County, Kentucky, in the United States. The population was 6,923 at the 2010 U.S. census.

Highland Heights is home to Northern Kentucky University and General Cable, a Fortune 500 company whose present headquarters were constructed in 1992. It is located in the Cincinnati metropolitan area.

History
The area has been known as "the Highlands" since the 19th century. The District of the Highlands was incorporated in 1867; Fort Thomas was separately incorporated from its northern reaches in 1914. The local post office was established in 1927, and the community of Highland Heights incorporated itself separately the same year.

Northern Kentucky State College, previously sited in Park Hills, was relocated to a larger campus in the city in 1971. It is now known as Northern Kentucky University (NKU), and subsidiary businesses and related developments have grown in the city.

In October 2012 Highland Heights resident Ryan Poston was murdered in his home. The perpetrator was his girlfriend, Shayna Hubers, who shot him six times. The case and trials attracted considerable media attention.

Geography
Highland Heights is located in northern Campbell County at  (39.040035, −84.455851). It is bordered to the north by Fort Thomas, to the west by Wilder, and to the south by Cold Spring. Interstate 275, the beltway around Cincinnati, runs along the western and northern edges of Highland Heights. Its interchange with Interstate 471 is at the northern border of Highland Heights.

Demographics

As of the census of 2010, there were 6,923 people, 2,610 households, and 1,282 families residing in the city. The racial makeup of the city was 90.8% White, 5% African American, 0.2% Native American, 2% Asian, less than 0.01%% Pacific Islander, 0.5% from other races, and 1.6% from two or more races. Hispanic or Latino of any race were 1.1% of the population.

There were 2,610 households, of which 18.4% had children under the age of 18 living with them, 33.1% were married couples living together, 11.9% had a female householder with no husband present, and 50.9% were non-families. 38.4% of all households were made up of individuals, and 13.9% had someone living alone who was 65 years of age or older. The average household size was 2.08 and the average family size was 2.77.

In the city, the population was spread out, with 13.6% under the age of 18, 33.7% from 18 to 24, 20.9% from 25 to 44, 18.3% from 45 to 64, and 13.5% who were 65 years of age or older. The median age was 26.3 years. For every 100 females, there were 84.5 males. For every 100 females age 18 and over, there were 79.4 males.

The median income for a household in the city was $40,784, and the median income for a family was $48,090. Males had a median income of $38,314 versus $29,038 for females. The per capita income for the city was $19,651. About 5.0% of families and 8.9% of the population were below the poverty line, including 9.9% of those under age 18 and 9.8% of those age 65 or over.

Education
Residents are within the Campbell County School District. Residents are zoned to Campbell County High School in Alexandria.

The Japanese Language School of Greater Cincinnati is a weekend supplementary Japanese school held at NKU. It was scheduled to move to NKU in July 1993.

References

External links

City of Highland Heights official website

Cities in Campbell County, Kentucky
Cities in Kentucky